McIntosh Road is a historic Native American route in the northern part of the U.S. states of Alabama and Georgia. It was named for the prominent Creek Indian chief William McIntosh, a leader of the Lower Towns. He helped improve it in the early 19th century, to connect Creek towns in what are now two states.

The original McIntosh Road, called the "Georgia Road" in Alabama, led from Kymulga Ferry near Childersburg, Alabama to Talladega, Alabama, then northeasterly traveling along the south side of the Choccolocco Creek valley and crossing the ridge containing Cheaha Mountain at a pass some miles north. It travels through the area of modern Hollis Crossroads and crosses the Tallapoosa River at an Okfuskee village, continuing in a southeasterly direction to the Chattahoochee River near modern Whitesburg, Georgia in Carroll County.
	
The road continues today along its original axis in Talladega and Calhoun counties in Alabama, and the original track virtually disappears as it enters the mountains of Cleburne County. The eastern terminus was at McIntosh's Ferry, which he operated on the Chattahoochee River near his plantation, known as "Lochau" or "Lockchau Talofau" on Acorn Bluff.

Today McIntosh Reserve Park in Carroll County, Georgia preserves some of the McIntosh plantation and his burial site near his former home, at the eastern end of what was once McIntosh Road. McIntosh was executed at his plantation on April 30, 1825, by Law Defenders on order of the Creek National Council, for having signed the Treaty of Indian Springs of 1825 and ceded much of the communal Creek lands in Georgia and Alabama to the United States.

President Thomas Jefferson discussed the benefits of providing provisions and lodging for travelers with McIntosh during a meeting November 2, 1805. McIntosh built a modest hotel along the road.

This route is also called the McIntosh Trail. In the early 21st century, the McIntosh Trail Historic Preservation Society in Georgia has been working to have that portion in Georgia designated as a scenic byway by the state department of transportation. The route begins at Indian Springs and travels through Coweta, Butts, Spalding, Fayette, and Carroll counties, and through downtown Newnan, Sharpsburg, and Senoia. By 2011, the alignment of the  route had gained preliminary approval.

During the last months of the American Civil War, Union regiments under General John T. Croxton used the route to invade Georgia in April 1865.

The road in Alabama can be followed by U.S. Route 431 (US 431), Alabama State Route 21 (SR 21), Talladega County Route 180 (CR 180), and Talladega CR 240, paralleling the Norfolk Southern Railway tracks to the Kymulga Mill And Covered Bridge.

See also

References

Streets in Alabama
Streets in Georgia (U.S. state)
U.S. Route 431
Historic trails and roads in Alabama
Historic trails and roads in Georgia (U.S. state)